Malyn (sometimes spelled Malin) is a city in Zhytomyr Oblast (province) of Ukraine located about  northwest of Kyiv. It served as the administrative center of Malyn Raion, now located in Korosten Raion. Population: 

Located in a wooded area of Polesia (literally woodland), the city is known for its paper factory and a sheet of paper is depicted on the city's coat of arms. The city is located on Irsha river which is a left tributary of Teteriv.

Through the city runs an important railroad Kyiv – Korosten and a motor vehicle highway Kyiv-Kovel-Warsaw.

The town hosts a seismic monitoring station (designated PS-45) belonging to an international network of nuclear test monitoring stations intended to verify the Comprehensive Test Ban Treaty (CTBT) treaty.

FC Papirnyk Malyn is a Ukrainian football team based in Malyn.

History
The name of the city is traditionally connected with the Prince of Drevlian Mal who is mentioned in the Russian chronicles, particularly during the 945 uprising of Drevlian against Igor, the Grand Prince of Kyiv.

Malyn is a small homeland of Nicholas Miklouho-Maclay, an Imperial Russian traveler, for whom Malyn served a residence to maternal side of his family.

During World War II, Malyn was under German occupation from 29 July 1941 until 12 November 1943. It was administered as a part of the Reichskommissariat Ukraine.

At least five people were killed in Malyn in the 2022 Russian invasion of Ukraine.

Gallery

People from Malyn 
 Batia Lishansky, Israeli sculptor
 Rayisa Nedashkivska, Soviet-Ukrainian theater and cinema actress
 David Nowakowsky, composer
 Rachel Yanait Ben-Zvi, Israeli author and educator
 Yuriy Karpenko, Ukrainian linguist, doctor of philology
 Volodymyr Vaisblat, Ukrainian-Jewish scriptwriter and dramaturge, co-founder of the Ukrainian State Publishing, son of the Kyiv Head Rabbi Nykhim Vaisblat
 Volodymir Satsyuk, former deputy head of Ukraine’s intelligence agency, a suspect in president Yushchenko's poisoning.

References

External links 
 Malyn site (unofficial) 
 Malyn region site (official) 
 City portal (unofficial) 
 Malyn website (unofficial) 
 Find out Malyn @ Ukrainian Travel
 Nuclear Threat Initiative

Cities in Zhytomyr Oblast
Radomyslsky Uyezd
Kiev Voivodeship
Drevlians
Cities of regional significance in Ukraine